John Daniel Hammerton (22 March 1900 – 15 June 1978) was an English footballer.

Flood played for Oughtibridge, Barnsley, Rotherham County, York City and Mansfield Town.

References

1900 births
Footballers from Sheffield
1978 deaths
English footballers
Association football forwards
Barnsley F.C. players
Rotherham County F.C. players
York City F.C. players
Mansfield Town F.C. players
English Football League players
Midland Football League players